John Raymond Smeaton (29 July 1914 – February 1984) was a Scottish professional footballer who played as an inside forward for Sunderland.

References

1914 births
1984 deaths
Footballers from Perth, Scotland
Scottish footballers
Association football inside forwards
Scone Thistle F.C. players
St Johnstone F.C. players
Blackburn Rovers F.C. players
Sunderland A.F.C. players
Jeanfield Swifts F.C. players
Albion Rovers F.C. players
East Fife F.C. players
English Football League players
Scottish Junior Football Association players
Scottish Football League players